Eleocharis ochrostachys, commonly known as spike rush, is a sedge of the family Cyperaceae that is native to Australia and Asia.

Description
The sedge has short rhizomes and long stolons.
The leaves have membranous sheaths and are a purplish colour at the base. The flowers are on pale green cylindrical spikelets cylindrical that are wider than the stem. After flowering biconvex light brown to grey coloured nuts form that are ribbed on the margins with an obovate to broadly obovate shape that are s in length.

Taxonomy
The species was first formally described by the botanist Ernst Gottlieb von Steudel in 1854 as part of the work Synopsis Plantarum Glumacearum. Several synonyms are known including; Eleocharis variegata var. laxiflora, Scirpus laxiflorus and Eleocharis difformis.

Distribution
It is found in and around swampy areas throughout its extensive range. The range of the plant includes coastal areas in Australia, India, China, Japan, Micronesia and Melanesia. In Australia the plant is often in closed forest or in Melaleuca dominated swamps in wet areas such as swamps, creek-lines or damp depressions. The sedge has a scattered distribution in northern Australia through parts of the Kimberley region of Western Australia, the top end of the Northern Territory, parts of northern Queensland and coastal parts of New South Wales.

References

Plants described in 1854
Flora of Western Australia
ochrostachys